Gao Baorong (920–960), courtesy name Dechang (德長), formally Prince Zhenyi of Nanping (南平貞懿王), was King of Nanping from 948 to 960, one of the Ten Kingdoms in south-central China.

References

920 births
960 deaths
Jingnan rulers